José Felipe Puelles Espina (born 9 November 1960) is a Mexican politician affiliated with the National Action Party. As of 2014 he served as Deputy of the LIX Legislature of the Mexican Congress representing Puebla.

References

1960 births
Living people
Politicians from Puebla
National Action Party (Mexico) politicians
Universidad de las Américas Puebla alumni
Members of the Congress of Puebla
20th-century Mexican politicians
21st-century Mexican politicians
Deputies of the LIX Legislature of Mexico
Members of the Chamber of Deputies (Mexico) for Puebla